Shellow Bowells (or occasionally misspelt as Shellow Bowels) is a village and former civil parish in the Epping Forest District of Essex, England. In 1931 the civil parish had a population of 95.

Since 1946 the village has been part of the civil parish of Willingale. The village name is believed to be derived from Shellow, meaning a bend in the river, and the Beaulieu family.

The village church, dedicated to St Peter and St Paul, is no longer in use as such, having become a private dwelling.

Shellow Bowells is mentioned by Bill Bryson in Notes From A Small Island and Paul Theroux's The Kingdom By The Sea. It is referred to as Shallow Bowells in Part Five of Random Harvest by James Hilton.

References

External links

Villages in Essex
Former civil parishes in Essex
Epping Forest District